Marc Prensky (born March 15, 1946, New York City, United States) is an American writer and speaker on education. He is best known as the creator of the terms "Digital native" and "digital immigrant" which he described in a 2001 article in "On the Horizon".

Prensky holds degrees from Oberlin College (1966), Middlebury College (MA, 1967), Yale University (1968) and the Harvard Business School (1980). He is the author of seven books: Digital Game-Based Learning (McGraw-Hill 2001),  Don't Bother Me Mom – I'm Learning (Paragon House 2006),  Teaching Digital Natives (Corwin Press 2010), From Digital Natives to Digital Wisdom: Hopeful Essays for 21st Century Learning (2012), Brain Gain: Technology and the Quest for Digital Wisdom (2012), The World Needs a New  Curriculum (The Global Future Education Foundation, 2014), Education To Better Their World: Unleashing the power of 21st century kids (Teachers College Press, 2016) and 100 essays on learning and education. Prensky also designed the first first-person-shooter game for corporate training (Straight Shooter, 1987) and a suite of eight learning game templates (For Corporate Gameware in 1996.)

Prensky began his career as a teacher in Harlem, New York. He has taught in elementary school, (New Haven CT), high school (New York, NY), and college (Wagner College, Staten Island, NY) and in the mid-1970s he also earned money playing his lute in a classical music restaurant/bar. He worked for six years (1981-1987) as a corporate strategist and product development director with the Boston Consulting Group, and six years (1993-1999) for Bankers Trust on Wall St., where he created game-based training for financial traders, and started an internal division, Corporate Gameware, later spun out as games2train.

Focus and research 
Prensky's professional focus is on K-12 education reform. His books address tools (Digital Game-Based Learning), pedagogy (Teaching Digital Natives), curriculum (The World Needs a New Curriculum) and the entire k-12 system (Education to Better Their World.)

Prensky is a strong advocate for listening more carefully to what students say about their own education.  In his speaking engagements he has conducted approximately 100 student panels in 40 countries.

He has been named a "guiding star of the new parenting movement" by Parental Intelligence Newsletter.

Criticism 
Bax (2011) has written that Prensky's views are simplistic, that his terminology is open to challenge and that his claim that educators should simply alter their approach to suit young people who are 'digital natives' ignores essential elements of the nature of learning and good pedagogy. The Economist (2010) questioned whether the designation of the 'digital native' has any real-world usefulness.

Prensky responds that: ”The distinction between digital natives and digital immigrants is important because it is more cultural than technology-knowledge-based.  ‘Digital Immigrants’ grew up in a non-digital, pre-Internet culture before they experienced the digital one.  ‘Digital Natives’ know only the digital culture.” Prensky further argues that “the fields of education and pedagogy have today become needlessly and painfully over-complicated, ignoring our students’ (and our world’s) real needs. It is time to reassess what good and effective teaching means in a digital age and how to combine what is important from the past with the tools of the future." Prensky argues that “despite recent influxes of technology into schools, not enough attention is being paid to the full implications of all the important recent changes in our educational environment and context”.

Books
Prensky’s books include:-
Digital Game-Based Learning
Don't Bother Me Mom — I'm Learning
Teaching Digital Natives — Partnering for Real Learning
From Digital Natives to Digital Wisdom: Hopeful Essays for 21st Century Learning
Brain Gain: Technology and the Quest for Digital Wisdom
The World Needs a New Curriculum
Education To Better Their World: Unleashing the Power of 21st Century Kids

Volumes edited
 Games and Simulation in Online Learning (with Gibson)

References

Living people
1946 births
Writers from New York City
Oberlin College alumni
Yale University alumni
Harvard Business School alumni